The 1923 Canisius football team was an American football team that represented Canisius College as an independent during the 1923 college football season. Canisius compiled an 8–1 record, shut out eight of nine opponents, and outscored all opponents by a total of 227 to 21. Luke Urban was the head coach for the third year, and Russell Burt was the team captain. Trainer Jimmy Hutch was credited for having "kept the Jesuit mole skin artists in trim throughout the season."

Key players included Russell Burt, Louie Feist, "Chick" Guarnieri, and Ned Weldon.

Schedule

References

Canisius
Canisius Golden Griffins football seasons
Canisius football